Gaussia gomez-pompae is a palm which is endemic to Mexico.  The species grows on steep rocky limestone slopes in Oaxaca, Tabasco and Veracruz states in Mexico.

Description
Gaussia gomez-pompae are 10 to 14 metres tall.  Stems are 30 centimetres in diameter.  Trees have up to ten pinnately compound leaves.  Fruit are orange-red, 1.5 to 1.6 cm in diameter.

The species is classified as vulnerable, and is threatened by habitat destruction and degradation.

References

gomez-pompae
Endemic flora of Mexico
Trees of Mexico
Vulnerable plants
Taxonomy articles created by Polbot